Datuk Mohammad Nor bin Mohammad Khalid (born 5 March 1951), more commonly known as Lat, is a Malaysian cartoonist.  Winner of the Fukuoka Asian Culture Prize in 2002, Lat has published more than 20 volumes of cartoons since he was 13 years old.  His works mostly illustrate Malaysia's social and political scenes, portraying them in a comedic light without bias.  Lat's best known work is The Kampung Boy (1979), which has been published in several countries across the world.  In 1994, the Sultan of Perak bestowed the honorific title of datuk on Lat, in recognition of the cartoonist's work in helping to promote social harmony and understanding through his cartoons. Lat also works for the government to improve the city's social security.

Born in a village, Lat spent his youth in the countryside before moving to the city at the age of 11.  While in school, he supplemented his family's income by contributing cartoon strips to newspapers and magazines.  He was 13 years old when he achieved his first published comic book, Tiga Sekawan (Three Friends Catch a Thief).  After failing to attain the grades that were required to continue education beyond high school, Lat became a newspaper reporter.  In 1974, he switched careers to be an editorial cartoonist.  His works, reflecting his view about Malaysian life and the world, are staple features in national newspapers such as New Straits Times and Berita Minggu.  He adapted his life experiences and published them as his autobiographies, The Kampung Boy and Town Boy, telling stories of rural and urban life with comparisons between the two.

Lat's style has been described as reflective of his early influences, The Beano and The Dandy.  He has, however, come into his own way of illustration, drawing the common man on the streets with bold strokes in pen and ink.  A trademark of his Malay characters is their three-loop noses.  Lat paid attention to family life and children because of his idolisation of Raja Hamzah, a senior cartoonist who was also popular in the 1960s with his comics about swashbuckling heroes.  Rejabhad, a well-respected cartoonist, was Lat's mentor, and imbued the junior cartoonist with a preference to be sensitive to the subjects of his works.  Lat's attention to details gained him popularity, endearing his works to the masses who find them believable and unbiased.

Aside from writing and publishing cartoons, Lat has ventured into the fields of animation, merchandising, and theme parks with his creations.  His name and works are recognised internationally; foreign cartoonists, such as Matt Groening and Sergio Aragonés, admire his art, and foreign governments invite Lat to tour their countries, hoping to gain greater exposure for their countries through Lat's cartoons of his experiences in them.  After 27 years of living and working in Kuala Lumpur, Lat moved back to Ipoh for a more sedate lifestyle in semi-retirement.

Childhood and education 

Mohammad Nor Khalid was born on 5 March 1951 in  Kota Bharu, a small settlement located in Gopeng, Perak, Malaysia.  His father was a government clerk with the Malaysian Armed Forces, and his mother a housewife.  Khalid was a stocky boy with a cherubic face, which led his family to nickname him bulat (round).  His friends shortened it to "Lat"; it became the name by which he was more commonly known in his kampung and later in the world.  Lat was the eldest child in his family,  and he often played in the jungles, plantations, and tin mines with his friends.  Their toys were usually improvised from everyday sundries and items of nature.  Lat liked to doodle with materials provided by his parents, and his other forms of recreation were reading comics and watching television; Lat idolised local cartoonist Raja Hamzah, who was popular with his tales of swashbuckling Malay heroes.  Malaysian art critic and historian Redza Piyadasa believes Lat's early years in the kampung ingrained the cartoonist with pride in his kampung roots and a "peculiarly Malay" outlook—"full of [...] gentleness and refinement".

Lat's formal education began at a local Malay kampung (village) school; these institutions often taught in the vernacular and did not aspire to academic attainment.  The boy changed schools several times; the nature of his father's job moved the family from one military base to another across the country, until they settled back at his birthplace in 1960.  A year later, Lat passed the Special Malay Class Examination, qualifying him to attend an English medium boarding school—National Type Primary School—in the state's capital, Ipoh.  His achievement helped his father make the decision to sell their kampung estate and move the family to the town; society in those days considered education at an English medium school a springboard to a good future.  Lat continued his education at Anderson School, Perak's "premier non-missionary English medium school".  Redza highlights Lat's move to Ipoh for higher schooling as a significant point in the cartoonist's development; the multi-racial environment helped establish his diverse friendships, which in turn broadened his cultural perspectives.

At the age of nine, Lat began to supplement his family's income through his artistic skills by drawing comics and selling them to his friends.  Four years later, in 1964, the young cartoonist achieved his first published work: a local movie magazine—Majalah Filem—printed his comic strips, paying him with movie tickets.  Lat's first comic book publication, Tiga Sekawan (Three Friends Catch a Thief), was published by Sinaran Brothers that year.  The company had accepted Lat's submission, mistaking him for an adult and paying him 25 Malaysian ringgits (RM) for a story about three friends who band together to catch thieves.  In 1968, at the age of 17, Lat started penning Keluarga Si Mamat (Mamats Family), a comic strip for Berita Minggu (the Sunday edition of Berita Harian).  The series ran in the paper every week for 26 years.  Although still a schoolboy, Lat was earning a monthly income of RM100, a large sum in those days, from his cartoons.  His education finished two years later at the end of Form 5; his Third Grade in the Senior Cambridge examinations was not enough for him to advance to Form 6.  Graduating with an education equivalent to that of high school, Lat started looking for a job and had his sights set on becoming an illustrator.

Reporter to cartoonist 

Moving to the Malaysian capital Kuala Lumpur, Lat applied for a cartoonist's position at Berita Harian.  He was told there was no vacancy, but the paper's editor, Abdul Samad Ismail, offered him the post of a crime reporter.  Lat accepted, a decision he explained was borne from necessity rather than choice: "It was a question of survival.  I had to earn money to help support the family."  At that time, Lat's father had fallen seriously ill and could not work; Lat had to become the breadwinner of his family.  Aside from taking the job, he continued contributing cartoons to other publications.  Lat was later transferred to Beritas parent publication, New Straits Times.  Moving throughout the city to report on crimes gave Lat opportunities to observe and interact with the myriads of lives in the urban landscape, enabling him to gather material for his cartoons and increasing his understanding of the world.  Nevertheless, he felt he lacked the persistently inquisitive nature needed to succeed as a crime reporter.  Furthermore, his "breathtakingly detailed, lurid and graphically gory descriptions" of the aftermaths of crimes had to be frequently toned down by his seniors.  Lat became convinced that he was a failure at his job, and his despondency led him to tender his resignation.  Samad, believing Lat had a bright future with the press, furiously rejected the letter.

Lat's career took a turn for the better on 10 February 1974; Asia Magazine, a periodical based in Hong Kong, published his cartoons about Bersunat—a circumcision ceremony all Malaysian boys of the Islamic faith have to undergo.  The cartoons impressed Tan Sri Lee Siew Yee, editor-in-chief of the New Straits Times.  Lee found Lat's portrayal of the important ceremony humorous yet sensitive, and grumbled that the newspaper should have hired the artist.  He was surprised to be told that Lat was already working within his organisation.  Lat was called to Lee's office to have a talk, which raised the reporter's profile in the company.  He became the paper's column cartoonist, taking up a position created for him by Samad, now deputy editor of the New Straits Times.  His first duty was to document Malaysian culture in a series of cartoons titled Scenes of Malaysian Life.  The newspaper also sent him to study for four months at St Martin's School of Art in London, where he was introduced to English editorial cartoons and newspapers.  Returning to Malaysia full of fascination with his experience, Lat transformed Scenes of Malaysian Life into a series of editorial cartoons.  His approach proved popular, and at the end of 1975 he was appointed full-time cartoonist with total freedom in his work.

Lat produced a steady stream of editorial cartoons that entertained Malaysian society.  By 1978, two collections of his works (Lots of Lat and Lat's Lot) had been compiled and sold to the public.  Although Malaysians knew of Lat through Scenes of Malaysian Life, it was his next work that propelled him into national consciousness and international recognition.  In 1979, Berita Publishing Sendirian Berhad published Lat's The Kampung Boy, an autobiographical cartoon account of his youth.  The book was a commercial hit; according to Lat, the first printing—60,000 to 70,000 copies—sold out within four months of the book's release.  Readers of the book were captivated by his "heart-warming" portrayal of Malaysian rural life, rendered with "scribbly black-and-white sketches" and accompanied by "simple but eloquent prose".  By 2009, the book has been reprinted 16 times and published in several other countries in various languages, including Portuguese, French, and Japanese. The success of The Kampung Boy established Lat as the "most renowned cartoonist in Malaysia."

After The Kampung Boy 

In 1981, Town Boy was published.  It continued The Kampung Boys story, telling of the protagonist's teenage life in an urban setting.  Two more compilations of Lat's editorial cartoons (With a Little Bit of Lat and Lots More Lat) were published and the number of people who recognised him continued to grow.  In 1984, partly from a desire to step away from the limelight, Lat resigned from the New Straits Times to become a freelancer, but continued to draw Scenes of Malaysia Life for the newspaper.  He set up his own company, Kampung Boy Sendirian Berhad (Village Boy private limited), to oversee the merchandising of his cartoon characters and publishing of his books.  In 2009, Kampung Boy partnered Sanrio and Hit Entertainment in a project to open an indoor theme park which would later be called as Puteri Harbour Family Theme Park in Nusajaya, Johor in August 2012. One of the park's attractions will be the sight of performers dressed up as Kampung Boy characters beside those in Hello Kitty and Bob the Builder costumes and also reported in August 2012 will be a Lat-inspired diner called Lat's Place. It will be designed in a Malaysian village setting, coupled with animations for patrons to interact with.

Lat has experimented with media other than paper. In 1993 he produced a short animated feature, Mina Smiles, for Unesco; the video, featuring a female lead, was for a literacy campaign.  Personal concerns motivated Lat for his next foray into animation; judging that Western animation of the 1980s and 90s had negative influences, he wanted to produce a series for Malaysian children that espoused local values.  The result was Kampung Boy the television series (1997), an adaptation of his trademark comic.  The 26-episode series received positive reviews for technical details and content. There were comments on its similarities to The Simpsons, and on its English which was not entirely local.  His most recent involvement with animation was in 2009; Lat's Window to the World, a musical animated feature, played at the Petronas Philharmonic Hall.  Lat had been commissioned to help create three animated vignettes based on The Kampung Boy to accompany the instruments of the Malaysian Philharmonic Orchestra.  The scores, composed by Carl Davis, complemented Lat's visuals, capturing the spirit of kampung childhood in a "simple, idyllic past".

In 1997, after 27 years of living in Kuala Lumpur, Lat moved back to Ipoh with his family. Aside from retreating slightly from the cartooning scene, he wanted to be close to his old kampung and let his children experience life in a small town or village; he had married in 1977, and the couple have four children—two daughters and two sons.  Lat said that raising his children has helped him cope with the pressures of his fame and made him realise that he might be losing touch with the new generation of Malaysians who have different tastes in cartoons.  His wife helps him in his work, scanning his completed cartoons and emailing them to the newspaper offices in Kuala Lumpur.  Lat still draws with his usual pens and inks, avoiding the use of computers except to read his emails.  In 2011–12, he is to join other artists from around the world in Italy for the Civitella Ranieri Fellowship programme.  During their one-month stay, they are encouraged to share ideas in an environment fostered to stimulate their creativity.

Art style 
Lat covers various genres in his works.  His portfolio is diverse; John A. Lent, a scholar of Asian cartoons, found it to difficult to classify the cartoonist into any particular field.  In his Keluarga Si Mamat series, Lat drew slapsticks and satires that examined the encounters between traditional and modern values.  Humorous stories of children at play also populated the series.  Jennifer Rodrigo Willmott, writer for Reader's Digest, stated that: 

Using a large cast of characters—a wide assortment of personalities and cultures—allows Lat to comment on a wider range of topics than is possible with a small group of characters.  Malaysian comics scholar Muliyadi Muhamood commented that the humour in Lat's cartoons is evoked through graphical and textual means; "short, compact dialogues" and puns form the text while "facial expressions and actions" of the characters help to bring out the funny side of things.  Muliyadi further stated that Lat's works offer many levels of interpretation; one reader would laugh at Lat's cartoon for its slapstick, while another would find the same work hilarious for its subtle critique of society.  As an example, Muliyadi referred to a Keluarga Si Mamat strip published in 1972.  Malaysia was facing a shortage of qualified physical education teachers then, and such duties were often placed on the shoulders of teachers of other faculties.  Lat illustrated an obese teacher who conducted a physical education session to his eventual collapse.  Muliyadi suggested that the cartoon could be interpreted as a simple tease of the teacher's plight, a suggestion to examine the curriculum taught (change physical education to an informal session), a remark on the shortage of teachers, or more extremely, a criticism of the government's failure to prevent the situation from happening.

The narration of Lat's early cartoons, such as Tiga Sekawan and Keluarga Si Mamat, was in Malay.  His later works, however, were mostly in English; Scenes of Malaysian Life ran only in the English-language New Straits Times.  The English idiom in his works reflects the local pidgin form—"Malglish"—containing smatterings of Malay words and a simpler grammatical structure.  After a string of successful English publications, Lat worried he had neglected Malaysians who were not proficient in English.  He drew Mat Som, a story of a kampung boy who moved to the city to work as a writer and courted a pretty city girl.  The comic was in Malay and a commercial hit; its first print of 30,000 copies sold out in three months.  Far Eastern Economic Review journalist Suhaini Aznam remarked that Lat's strength was his ability to portray the plight of the common man in a satiric light without any form of bias.

Early style 
Lat's artistic skills were cultivated from youth and self-taught.  The cartoonist believes he inherited the talent and interest from his father, who doodled as a hobby and was notorious for his sense of humour as the "village jester".  Lat says his siblings were also gifted in drawing, but they never bothered to develop their talents.  His parents actively encouraged him to develop his artistic skills, although his father occasionally told him not to make a career of it.  He also received encouragement from outside his family; Lat's primary school teacher Mrs Moira Hew (the inspiration for one of his characters, the Butterfly-Glassed Lady), helped nurture his gift, frequently asking him to illustrate lessons in class.  Her teachings expanded Lat's mind and made him more receptive to ideas that looked beyond his kampung.

The early influences on his art style were from the West.  Like most of the Malaysian children in the 1950s, Lat watched Hanna-Barbera cartoons (The Flintstones and The Jetsons) on television and read imported British comics, such as The Dandy and The Beano.  He studied them and used their styles and themes in his early doodles.  After the foreign influences in his works were noticed by a family friend, Lat was advised by his father to observe and draw upon ideas from their surroundings instead.  Heeding the advice, the young cartoonist intimated himself with local happenings.  Tiga Sekawan was conceived as a humorous crime-fighting story of a local flavour.  Keluarga Si Mamat and its protagonist were named after his youngest brother Mamat, its stories based on Lat's observations of his fellow villagers and schoolmates.  The inspiration for his cartoons about Bersunat came about when he was on assignment at a hospital.  As he was taking breaks from investigating the dead victims of crime brought to the morgue, Lat chanced upon the circumcisions performed by the hospital on ethnic Malay boys.  He found their experiences clinical, devoid of the elaborate and personal ceremonies that celebrated his own rite to manhood in the village.  Lat felt compelled to illustrate the differences between life in his kampung and the city.

When Lat formally entered the cartooning industry, he was not totally unfamiliar with the profession.  He had the benefit of the mentorship of Rejabhad, an experienced political cartoonist.  Rejabhad was well respected by his countrymen, who titled him the "penghulu (chief) of Malay cartoonists".  After noticing Lat's submissions to newspapers and magazines, he corresponded with the young cartoonist.  When Rejabhad was requested by Lat's mother to take care of her 15-year-old son in the cartooning industry, he accepted.  He gave advice and influenced Lat's growth as a cartoonist.  Lat treated Rejabhad with great respect, holding up his mentor as a role model.  The affection and admiration was mutual.  Thirty-six years after taking Lat under his wing, Rejabhad recounted their relationship in these words:

Rejabhad was not the first local figure to have exerted an influence on Lat.  Raja Hamzah, popular with his action comics and ghost stories, was Lat's "hero" in his childhood.  It was Raja Hamzah's cartoons of local swashbuckling adventurers that inspired Lat to become a cartoonist.  Tiga Sekawan was the culmination of that desire, the success after numerous failed submissions and an affirmation to Lat that he could become a cartoonist like his idol.  Raja Hamzah also had success with comic strips on family life, such as Mat Jambul's Family and Dol Keropok and Wak Tempeh.  These cartoons imbued Lat with a fascination of family life and the antics of children, which served him well in his later works.  Lat was interested in studying the details of his surroundings and capturing them in his works.  Keluarga Si Mamat and The Kampung Boy faithfully depicted their characters' appearances and attitudes.  Their narrations were written in a style that was natural to the locals.  Thus, Lat was able to make his readers believe his stories and characters were substantially "Malay".

Later style 
After his study trip to London in 1975, Lat's works exhibited the influences of editorial cartoonists such as Frank Dickens, Ralph Steadman, and Gerald Scarfe.  In 1997, Ron Provencher, a professor emeritus at Northern Illinois University, reported that Lat's style reminded his informants on the Malaysian cartooning scene of The Beano.  Muliyadi elaborated that The Beano and The Dandys "theme of a child's world" is evident in Lat's Keluarga Si Mamat.  Others commented that Lat's art stood out on its own.  Singaporean cartoonist Morgan Chua believed that Lat "managed to create an impressively local style while remaining original", and although comics historian Isao Shimizu found Lat's lines "somewhat crude", he noted that the cartoonist's work was "highly original" and "full of life".  Redza's judgement was that The Beano and The Dandy were "early formative [influences]" on Lat before he came into his own style.  Lent gave his assessment in 1999:

Lat's work with pen and ink so impressed Larry Gonick that the American cartoonist was tempted into experimenting with this medium for part of his The Cartoon History of the Universe.  Gonick tried to use the medium as he did his regular brushes; however, the results proved unsatisfactory.  Lat occasionally colours his works, such as those in his Kampong Boy: Yesterday and Today (1993), using watercolour or marker pens.  According to Lent, Redza judged that Lat had "elevated cartooning to the level of 'high visual arts' through his social commentary and 'construction of the landscape'".  The art critic was not alone in having a high regard for Lat's works.  Jaafar Taib, cartoonist and editor of Malaysian satirical magazine Gila-Gila, found Lat's cartoons retained their humour and relevance throughout time.  He explained that this quality arose from the well-thought-out composition of Lat's works, which helped to clearly express the ideas behind the cartoons.

Sensitive topics 

At the time that Lat started drawing for the New Straits Times, local political cartoonists were gentle in their treatment of Malaysian politicians; the politicians' features were recreated faithfully and criticisms were voiced in the form of subtle poems.  Lat, however, pushed the boundaries; although he portrayed the politicians with dignity, he exaggerated notable features of their appearances and traits.  Lat recalled that in 1974, he was told to change one of his works, which portrayed Malaysian Prime Minister Abdul Razak from the back.  Lee refused to print the work unchanged, and pointedly asked the cartoonist "You want to go to jail?!"  In 1975, however, Lat's next attempt at a political cartoon won Lee's approval.  The satire featured a caricature of Razak's successor—Hussein Onn—on the back of a camel, travelling back to Kuala Lumpur from Saudi Arabia; its punchline was Hussein's hailing of his mount to slow down after reading news that a pay raise for the civil service would be enacted on his return.

Malaysia's political class grew comfortable with Lat's caricatures, and like the rest of the country, found them entertaining.  Muliyadi described Lat's style as "subtle, indirect, and symbolic", following traditional forms of Malaysian humour in terms of ethics and aesthetics.  The cartoonist's compliance with tradition in his art earned him the country's respect.  When Lat was critical of politicians, he portrayed them in situations "unusual, abnormal or unexpected" to their status or personalities, using the contrast to make the piece humorous.  Mahathir bin Mohamad, Malaysia's fourth Prime Minister, was Lat's frequent target for much of his political career, providing more than 20 years worth of material to the cartoonist—enough for a 146-page compilation Dr Who?! (2004).  Lat's political wit targeted not only local politicians, but also Israeli actions in the Middle East and foreign figures such as prominent Singaporean politician Lee Kwan Yew.  Despite his many works of political nature, Lat does not consider himself a political cartoonist and openly admits that there are others better than he is in this field.

Lat prefers to portray his ideas with as little antagonism as possible.  He heeds the advice of his mentor, Rejabhad, and is aware of sensitivities, especially those of race, culture, and religion.  As he devises the concept for his cartoon, he eliminates anything he believes to be malicious or insensitive.  At the Fourth Asian Cartoon Exhibition in Tokyo, Lat revealed that when it came to making religious comments in his work, he only did so on his own religion (Islam).  In such cases, Lat uses his art to help educate the young about his faith.  Lat trusts his editors to do their jobs and cull what is socially unacceptable for print.  In an interview, he revealed his discomfort with the concept of self-publishing, believing that unadulterated or unsupervised cartoon drawing could lead to "rubbish".  He prefers to be assertive in areas with which he is comfortable or competent.  Lat is adamant on not changing what he has already drawn; several pieces of his cartoons remain unpublished because editors refused to print them unchanged.  When that happens, the editors spike (blank) the space for his regular cartoon in the newspaper.  Lat admitted of his unprinted works: "Okay, maybe I've pushed the line a little bit, but I've never got into trouble and, frankly, only a handful of my cartoons were ever spiked."

Interests and beliefs 

Music has played a crucial part in Lat's life since his youth; he revealed in an interview that listening to songs such as Peggy March's "I Will Follow Him" and Paul & Paula's "Hey Paula" helped him learn English.  Listening to music had also become an important ritual in his work, providing him with inspiration in his art.  When he sketches "fashionable girls", he puts on Paul McCartney's tracks, and switches to Indonesian gamelan when he needs to draw intricate details.  He enjoys pop music, particularly rock music of the 1950s and 60s, listening to The Beatles, Bob Dylan, and Elvis Presley.  Lat is also partial to country music, and to singers such as Hank Williams and Roy Rogers because he finds their tunes "humble".  His enjoyment of music is more than a passive interest; he is proficient with the guitar and piano, and can play them by ear.

Malaysian society used to look down on cartoonists, assuming that those who practised the trade were intellectually inferior to writers, or were lesser artists; Lat was not the only cartoonist to be paid with movie tickets in the 1950s; Rejabhad once received one ticket for ten cartoons, and many others were likewise recompensed, or were paid very little money.  Despite the lowly reputation of his profession at that time, Lat is very proud of his choice of career; he once took umbrage with an acquaintance's girlfriend for her presumption that the words and ideas in his cartoons were not his own.  Drawing cartoons is more than a career to him:

The elongated "L" in Lat's signature was born from his joy in completing a work.  He professes that his primary aim in drawing cartoons is to make people laugh; his role as a cartoonist is "to translate the reaction of the people into humorous cartoons".  He has no intentions to preach his beliefs through his art, believing that people should be free to make up their own minds and that the best he can do is to make readers ponder the deeper meanings behind a humorous scene.  The reward he has sought from drawing since his youth is simple:

Lat's pride in cartooning pushed him to promote the art as a respectable career.  In 1991, he banded together with fellow cartoonists Zunar, Rejabhad, and Muliyadi to start "Pekartun" (Persatuan Kartunis Selangor dan Kuala Lumpur).  This association holds exhibitions and forums, to raise public awareness of cartooning and to build relationships among its members.  It also helps to clarify legal issues such as copyrights to its members, and acts as an intermediary between them and the government.  In the previous year, Lat's company, Kampung Boy, had organised the first Malaysian International Cartoonists Gathering, bringing together cartoonists from several countries across the world to exhibit their art and participate in conferences to educate others in their work.  In Redza's opinion, Lat played a great role in making cartooning respectable among his fellow Malaysians.

Aside from promoting the rights of fellow cartoonists, Lat developed an interest in encouraging conservation of the natural environment.  Several of his works caricature the consequences of pollution and over-exploitation of resources.  Invited to give a speech at the 9th Osaka International Symposium on Civilisation in 1988, Lat talked about the environmental problems associated with overpopulation and heavy industrialisation.  He further reminisced about the simple cleaner life he had enjoyed as a child in the kampung.  In 1977, when a protest was organised against logging activities in the Endau-Rompin Reserves, Lat helped gain support for the movement by drawing cartoons in the newspapers that highlighted the issue.  Lat is also particularly concerned over what he sees as the negative side of urban development.  He believes that such developments have contributed to the loss of the traditional way of life; people forget the old culture and values as they ingratiate themselves with the rapid pace and sophistication of urban lifestyles.  His defence and fondness of the old ways are manifested in his The Kampung Boy, Town Boy, Mat Som, and Kampung Boy: Yesterday and Today, which champion the old lifestyles  as spiritually superior.

Influence and legacy 

Recognised globally, and widely popular in his country, Lat has been styled "cultural hero", "his nation's conscience in cartoon form" and "Malaysian icon" among other effusive titles.  The Malaysian Press Institute felt Lat had "become an institution in [his] own right", honouring him with their Special Jury Award in 2005.  Cartoonists in the Southeast Asian region, such as Muliyadi, Chua, and Rejabhad, have given high praise to Lat, and his admirers further abroad include North American cartoonists Matt Groening and Eddie Campbell.  Groening, creator of The Simpsons, gave a testimonial for the United States version of The Kampung Boy, praising Lat's signature work as "one of the all-time great cartoon books".  Sergio Aragonés, the creator of Groo the Wanderer, is another of Lat's American fans.  After visiting Malaysia in 1987, Aragonés used the experience to create a story for Groo in which the bumbling swordsman chances on the isle of Felicidad, whose inhabitants and natural habitat were modelled after those of the Southeast Asian country.  Aragonés drew the noses of the islanders in Lat's distinctive style, and named one of the prominent native characters—an inquisitive boy—after the Malaysian cartoonist.

Lent (2003) and Shimizu (1996) both suggest that the Malaysian comic industry began to boom after Lat joined the profession on a full-time basis in 1974.  Lent further hazards that the cartoonist profession was made more respectable in Malaysia by the award to Lat in 1994 of a datuk title (equivalent to a knighthood).  Bestowed on Lat by the Sultan of Perak, the title was Malaysia's highest recognition of the cartoonist's influence on his countrymen and his contributions to the country.  Before Lat's emergence, Malaysian cartooning was largely unappreciated by the public, despite the popular works of Raja Hamzad and Rejabhad.  Lat's successes showed Malaysians that they could thrive and succeed as cartoonists, and inspired them to look to the cartooning profession for potential careers.  Several younger artists imitated his style in the hopes of capturing equivalent rewards.  Zambriabu and Rasyid Asmawi copied the distinctive three loop noses and hairstyles of Lat's characters.  Others, such as Reggie Lee and Nan, incorporated Lat's detailed "thematic and stylistic approaches" in their works.  Muliyadi dubbed Lat the "Father of Contemporary Malaysian Cartoons", for being the first Malaysian cartoonist to achieve global recognition and for helping to improve the industry's image in their country.

The effects of Lat's works were not confined to the artistic sector.  In the period before his debut, Malaysian cartoonists supported calls for national unity.  The characters in a cartoon were often of one race, and negative focus on the foibles of particular races or cultures worked its way into the mainstream.  Such cartoons did not help to soothe racial tensions that were simmering then.  The situation erupted with the racial riots of 1969, and for several years after these incidents relationships among the races were raw and fragile.  According to Redza, Lat soothed the nation's racial woes with his works.  Drawing members of various races in his crowd scenes and showing their interactions with one another, Lat portrayed Malaysians in a gentle and unbiased comic manner.  Redza pointed out although one may argue that Lat was forced into the role of racial and cultural mediator (because of his employment with his country's "leading English-language newspaper serving a multi-racial readership"), he possessed the necessary qualities—intimate knowledge of various races and culture—to succeed in the job.  Lat's fans recognised the trademark of his oeuvre as "a safe and nice humour that made everyone feel good and nostalgic by appealing to their benevolent sides rather than by poking at their bad sides".  It proved to be a successful formula; more than 850,000 copies of his books were sold in the twelve years after the first compilation of his editorial cartoons went on sale in 1977.  The comfort that readers sought from his works was such that when in September 2008 Lat deviated from his usual style, to draw a cartoon about racially charged politicking in his country, it shocked journalist Kalimullah Hassan.  She found the illustration of a group of Malaysians huddled under an umbrella, taking shelter from a rain of xenophobic phrases, full of profound sadness.

Lat's works have been used in academic studies—the fields of which are diverse, spanning law, urban planning, and diets. The academics use his drawings to help them illustrate their points in a humorous yet educational manner.   Foreign embassy officials have sought Lat for his insight into the cultures of their societies.  They have invited him to tour their countries, in the hope that he will record his experiences in cartoon form to share with the world. The first country to do so was the United States, followed by others such as Australia, Germany, and Japan.  In 1998, Lat became the first cartoonist to be made an Eisenhower Fellow and revisited the United States; his research programme was the study of relationships among the many races in United States society.  In 2007, the National University of Malaysia awarded him an honorary Doctorate in Anthropology and Sociology.  Lat's works are recognised as visual records of Malaysia's cultural history; he was awarded a Fukuoka Asian Culture Prize in 2002 for preserving Malay rural culture in his works.

In 1986, Lat became the first cartoonist to exhibit his work at the National Museum in Kuala Lumpur; the event drew a record number of 600,000 visitors in two months.  He is treated as a celebrity, and his cartoon characters decorate stamps, financial guides, and aeroplanes.  When Reader's Digest asked Malaysians in 2010 to rank which of 50 local personalities was most worthy of trust, Lat was returned fourth on the list.  According to Jaafar, "100% of Malaysians respect and admire Lat, and see a Malaysian truth, whether he is drawing a policeman, teachers, or hookers."

List of major honours 
 1994 – Honorific title of datuk
 1998 – Eisenhower Fellowship
 2002 – Fukuoka Asian Culture Prize
 2005 – Petronas Journalism Awards (Special Jury Award)
 2007 – Honorary Doctorate in Anthropology and Sociology
 2010 – Civitella Ranieri Visual Arts Fellowship

List of selected works 
This is a partial list of Lat's books (first prints); excluded are translations and commissioned works, such as Latitudes (1986) for Malaysian Airlines and the annual personal financial management guides (since 1999) for Bank Negara Malaysia.

Notes and references

Notes

References

Bibliography 
Interviews/self-introspectives

 
 
 
 
 

 Books

 
 
 
 
 
 
 
 
 
 
 
 
 
 

Academic sources

 
 
 
 
 
 
 
 
 
 
 
 

Journalistic sources

 
 
 
 
 
 
 
 
 
 
 
 
 
 
 
 
 
 
 
 
 
 
 
 
 
 
 
 
 
 
 
 

Online sites

External links

 

1951 births
Living people
People from Perak
Malaysian people of Malay descent
Malaysian Muslims
Malaysian comics artists
Malaysian artists
Malaysian illustrators
Malaysian cartoonists